Betty Brown (born 1939) is a Texas politician.

Betty Brown may also refer to:

 Betty Jean Brown (born 1937), political figure in Prince Edward Island
 Betty Brown (bowls), Scottish indoor and lawn bowler
 Betty Brown, actress in silent film Davy Crockett at the Fall of the Alamo (1926)
 Betty Brown (1759–after 1831), daughter of mulatto slave Betty Hemings and slave owned by Thomas and Martha Jefferson
 Betty Brown, first wife of entertainer Ted Healy and a performer in Healy's stage show

See also
 Elizabeth Brown (disambiguation)
Betty Brown Lake, see List of lakes in Cleburne County, Arkansas